The Codington County Courthouse is a courthouse serving Codington County, located at 14 First Avenue Southeast, Watertown, South Dakota. Codington County is part of South Dakota's Third Circuit Court.

The building was constructed by Gray Construction, under the direction of architects Freed, Perkins & McWayne, between 1925 and 1929 at a cost US$375,000. The rotunda features two large murals painted by Vincent Aderente of New York, although his name is misspelled as Adoratti on the historical marker at the courthouse grounds. 

It was listed on the National Register of Historic Places in 1978.

References 

National Register of Historic Places in Codington County, South Dakota
Buildings and structures in Watertown, South Dakota
Government buildings completed in 1929